1521 Seinäjoki, provisional designation , is a Brasilia asteroid from the outer region of the asteroid belt, approximately 14 kilometers in diameter. It was discovered on 22 October 1938, by Finnish astronomer Yrjö Väisälä at the southwestern Turku Observatory, Finland. The asteroid was later named after the Finnish city of Seinäjoki.

Orbit and classification 

Seinäjoki is a member of the Brasilia family, a smaller asteroid family of X-type asteroids in the outer main-belt. Since the family's namesake, 293 Brasilia, is a suspected interloper in its own family, it has also been named Seinäjoki family after Seinäjoki.

It orbits the Sun in the outer main-belt at a distance of 2.5–3.2 AU once every 4 years and 10 months (1,760 days). Its orbit has an eccentricity of 0.14 and an inclination of 15° with respect to the ecliptic. The body's observation arc, however, begins with its official discovery observation at Turku.

Physical characteristics

Rotation and pole 

In October 2010, a rotational lightcurve of Seinäjoki was obtained by Russell Durkee at the U.S. Shed of Science Observatory in Minneapolis. It gave it a well-defined rotation period of 4.32 hours with a brightness variation of 0.15 magnitude. A modeled lightcurve form Lowell photometric database gave a concurring period of 4.328 hours and a spin axis of (-18.0°, 230.0°) in ecliptic coordinates.

Diameter and albedo 

According to the survey carried out by NASA's Wide-field Infrared Survey Explorer (WISE) with its subsequent NEOWISE mission, Seinäjoki measures between 13.66 and 14.81 kilometers in diameter, and its surface has an albedo between 0.205 and 0.22 (more recent results only).

The Collaborative Asteroid Lightcurve Link assumes a standard albedo for carbonaceous C-type asteroids of 0.057 and calculates a much larger diameter of 24.30 kilometers as a body's and diameter and reflectivity (albeo) correlate indirectly. However, based on the much higher albedo given by WISE/NEOWISE, the body is rather of a stony composition, which is untypical for asteroids in the outer main-belt.

Naming 

This minor planet was named for the city of Seinäjoki, located in Southern Ostrobothnia, western Finland. The official  was published by the Minor Planet Center on 20 February 1976.

References

External links 
 Asteroid Lightcurve Database (LCDB), query form (info )
 Dictionary of Minor Planet Names, Google books
 Asteroids and comets rotation curves, CdR – Observatoire de Genève, Raoul Behrend
 Discovery Circumstances: Numbered Minor Planets (1)-(5000) – Minor Planet Center
 
 

001521
Discoveries by Yrjö Väisälä
Named minor planets
19381022